The Golden Rooster Award for Best Actress (中国电影金鸡奖最佳女主角) is the main category of Competition of Golden Rooster Awards, awarding actresses with outstanding performances in leading roles in cinema of China.

Winners & nominees

Records
3 wins: Pan Hong (including 1 tied win)
2 wins: Gong Li, Song Chunli, Xi Meijuan
5 nominations: Xu Fan (0 win)
4 nominations: Zhang Ziyi (1 tied win)
3 nominations: Pan Hong, Xi Meijuan (2 win),  Naren Hua (1 win), Yan Bingyan (1 tied win)
Oldest winner: Jin Yaqin (80)

References

Film awards for lead actress
Golden Rooster, Best Actress
Actress, Best